Chim chum is a Southeast Asian street food, popular espically in Thailand.  It is traditionally made with chicken or pork and fresh herbs such as galangal, sweet basil, lemongrass and kaffir lime leaves, cooked in a small clay pot on a charcoal stove. It is often served with nam chim.

The name is derived from the words for dipping and dropping, the customary way of eating the dish.

Introduction 
Literally the word chim chum derived from two Thai words: chim and chum. Chim means to dip in, while chum means to drop something down quickly or briefly in or into liquid. The name chim chum comes from the way we cook and eat this popular hot pot. Chim chum is  an earthenware pot on a brazier at table top. The pot is filled with broth and to this, you add various supplied vegetables and herbs. The herbs are often pulled from trees the selection criteria being as broad as bitterness to health aspects. Some dishes place a flower in the pot which is a unique bitterness. Thai Northeastern people call this dish chaeo hon (แจ่วฮ้อน)

How to consume 
You are served with a clay pot filled with broth. When the broth is boiling, then you first add the vegetables. This will lower the temperature in the pot a little and you should wait until it boils again before putting a piece of meat in the pot using your chopstick, and cook the meat for just less than one minute or until it’s cooked, then enjoy the meat by dipping it into the sauce (nam chim).

How to cook

Chim chum 
Marinate the pork with oyster sauce, light soy sauce, and sugar. Let sit in the fridge overnight. Bring the chicken stock to the boil, add in galangal, lemongrass, kaffir lime leaves. When the stock is fragrant, add in Thai Sweet Basil. Add the fresh vegetable to the broth. You want to start with the food that takes longest to cook. Now bring the pot of boiling broth to the table. Each person cooks their meat by dipping it in the boiling broth. When it is cooked, dip the meat into the sauce. Cook the glass noodles for a few minutes. Flavor noodles with a bit of sauce.

Ingredient 
Together with the chim chum, some or most of the following secondary items are added.

 Your favorite meat
 Egg
 Glass noodles
 Assorted fresh vegetables

Beside the originally chim chum you can add any of your favorite meat also.

Nam chim

To make nam chim, pound the garlic, coriander roots and sea salt in a mortar and pestle. Don’t reduce to a paste. Add the chillies and crush lightly. Mix in the palm sugar, fish sauce, lime juice, and shallots. The longer the nam chim sits, the more intense the flavour will be. Best prepared 1 hour prior to using.

Ingredient 
 Garlic Cloves
 Coriander roots
 Sea salt
 Red chili
 Green chili
 Thai green chili
 Palm sugar syrup
 Fish sauce
 Limes
 Shallot

See also
Nam chim

References 

Thai cuisine